Płock Governorate (я ) was an administrative unit (governorate) of Congress Poland.

It was created in 1837 from the Płock Voivodship, and had the same borders and capital (Płock) as the voivodship. In 1867 territories of the Augustów Governorate and the Płock Governorate were divided into a smaller Płock Governorate, Suwałki Governorate (consisting mostly of the Augustów Governorate territories) and recreated Łomża Governorate.

The Governorate consisted of eight counties (uyezds):
Ciechanowski
Lipnowski
Mławski,
Płocki
Płoński
Przasnyski
Rypiński
Sierpecki

Language

By the Imperial census of 1897. In bold are languages spoken by more people than the state language.

References and notes

External links
 Gubernia płocka w Słowniku geograficznym Królestwa Polskiego i innych krajów słowiańskich, Tom VIII (Perepiatycha — Pożajście) z 1887 r.
Geographical Dictionary of the Kingdom of Poland

 
Governorates of Congress Poland
Płock
States and territories established in 1837